Vurlon Mills (born 11 February 1988) is a Guyanese international footballer who plays for Western Tigers, as a striker.

Career
Born in Georgetown, Mills has played club football for United Petrotrin, Fruta Conquerors, T&TEC, Caledonia AIA, FC Santa Rosa, Slingerz, San Juan Jabloteh, Georgetown and Western Tigers.

Mills made his international debut for Guyana in 2011, and has appeared in FIFA World Cup qualifying matches.

References

1988 births
Living people
Guyanese footballers
Guyana international footballers
United Petrotrin F.C. players
Fruta Conquerors FC players
T&TEC Sports Club players
Morvant Caledonia United players
Slingerz FC players
San Juan Jabloteh F.C. players
Georgetown FC players
Western Tigers FC players
TT Pro League players
Association football forwards
Guyanese expatriate footballers
Guyanese expatriate sportspeople in Trinidad and Tobago
Expatriate footballers in Trinidad and Tobago
Guyana under-20 international footballers